Eupelicini is a tribe of leafhoppers in the subfamily Deltocephalinae. Eupelicini contains 7 genera and over 60 species divided into two subtribes: Eupelicina and Paradorydiina.

Genera 
There are 7 described genera divided into two subfamilies:

Subtribe Eupelicina 

 Eupelix 

Subtribe Paradorydiina

References 

Deltocephalinae
Hemiptera tribes